Paul Richard Thomas (born 1977) is a French photographer known for his fashion and beauty photography. Traveling with his parents (both university teachers), he spent his childhood in Thailand then in Egypt where his father offered him his first camera.

Biography
Thomas started his career working as an illustrator for press and advertising, then, along his travels, he did his first photography shooting for French architecture and archaeology editorials.
Back to Paris he naturally turned himself to fashion photography, working with models from the major models agencies of the capital.
As his career in photography blossomed, he became known for covers, shot in his particular graphic style with international top models and French actress as Béatrice Dalle, Laura Smet, Helena Noguerra, Adriana Karembeu, Laura Paketova, Marie Gillain, Olga Kurylenko...
Beyond the setting of advertisings, Thomas also worked on other commercial projects including directing TV advertisings and music videos:  "Steps in the Dark" "Awake but half Dead","Save your Soul"...

References

 Paul Richard Thomas, Pascal Morabito
Paul Richard Thomas - Director 

1977 births
Living people
Fashion photographers
French photographers